In number theory, two positive integers a and b are said to be multiplicatively independent if their only common integer power is 1. That is, for integers n and m,  implies . Two integers which are not multiplicatively independent are said to be multiplicatively dependent.

As examples, 36 and 216 are multiplicatively dependent since , whereas 6 and 12 are multiplicatively independent.

Properties 

Being multiplicatively independent admits some other characterizations. a and b are multiplicatively independent if and only if  is irrational. This property holds independently of the base of the logarithm. 

Let  and  be the canonical representations of a and b.

Applications
Büchi arithmetic in base a and b define the same sets if and only if a and b are multiplicatively dependent. 

Let a and b be multiplicatively dependent integers, that is, there exists n,m>1 such that .   The integers c  such that the length of its  expansion in base a is at most m are exactly  the integers such that the length of their expansion in base b is at most n. It implies that computing the base b expansion of a number, given its base a expansion, can be done by transforming consecutive sequences of m  base a digits into consecutive sequence of n base b digits.

References

Number theory